The Central District of Shadegan County is a district (bakhsh) in Shadegan County, Khuzestan Province, Iran. At the 2006 census, its population (including those portions later detached to form Khanafereh District) was 138,226, in 23,813 families; excluding those portions, the population in 2006 was 114,119, in 19,847 families.  The district has two cities: Shadegan and Darkhoveyn. The district has five rural districts (dehestan): Abshar Rural District, Buzi Rural District, Darkhoveyn Rural District, Hoseyni Rural District, and Jaffal Rural District.

References 

Shadegan County
Districts of Khuzestan Province